Cell structure may refer to:
 Cell (biology)#Anatomy
 An organelle, or the layout of organelles of the biological cell itself
 The structure of a covert cell, often involved in underground resistance, organised crime, terrorism or any group requiring stealth in its operations
 In mathematics, the structure of a cell complex